Baseball is the national game of Nicaragua, and is one of the most popular sports in the country. Nicaragua has a professional baseball league, the Nicaraguan Professional Baseball League, consisting of four teams, playing in the winter, and a semiprofessional league, El Campeonato German Pomares, playing in spring and summer. The national baseball team has been successful in the past, mainly throughout the 1970s. Nicaragua and near-by Panama are two countries who have baseball as their national sport, rather than soccer, the national sport of many Central American countries.

History timeline

Early history

Baseball was introduced in the 1880s by Albert Addlesberg, an American businessman living in Bluefields. During this time, the area around Bluefields was known as the autonomous Mosquito Reserve and a strong British influence in the area was evidenced by the popularity of cricket. Addlesberg convinced two of the most popular cricket clubs to switch to baseball and supplied the locals with equipment he imported from New Orleans. Carter Donaldson, who was the U.S. Consul in Nicaragua at the time, founded the first continuous team in 1904. United States Marines stationed in Nicaragua in the early part of the 20th century were also credited for bringing the sport to the country, and popularizing it in the area.

1960s and 1970s
Professional baseball came to an end in Nicaragua in 1967, after years of political and economic problems. In the 1970s, however, baseball again became popular after the success of the Nicaragua national baseball team.

1980s and 1990s
In the 1980s, popularity of baseball in the country began to decline. After the Nicaraguan civil war, baseball began to flourish again. The policy of Nicaraguan professional baseball before the 1990s was to discourage the recruitment of Nicaraguan players by Major League Baseball scouts. On August 6, 1990, the San Francisco Giants signed two players from Nicaragua, and considered building a baseball academy in a move that was seen as a step to normalizing the relationship between Nicaragua and Major League Baseball. During the 1996 Nicaraguan presidential election, candidates, Arnoldo Alemán, and Daniel Ortega, promised increased funding for the Nicaraguan national baseball team.

Present day
In the spring of 2004, professional baseball returned to Nicaragua for the first time since 1967. In a typical modern-day game, teams have sets of cheerleaders, as well as team mascots, and marching bands who play throughout the game. Dennis Martínez National Stadium, located in Managua, Nicaragua, is used by the Indios del Bóer of the Nicaraguan Professional Baseball League. The stadium has been described being in poor shape by many, including Nicaraguan native, and former Major League Baseball pitcher Dennis Martínez, whom the stadium is named after. The World Baseball Classic has been criticized by NBC Sports writer Joe Connor, after the WBC invited national baseball teams from China, Australia, and Italy, over teams from Nicaragua, and Colombia, where the sport is considerably more popular. In 2009 it was announced that a privately funded baseball academy would be built by the International Baseball Association in Villa El Carmen.

Nicaraguans in Major League Baseball

Professional baseball in Nicaragua

The Nicaraguan Professional Baseball League (La Liga Nicaragüense de Beisbol Profesional in Spanish) is the professional baseball league in Nicaragua. There are four teams that compete against each other, the Indios del Bóer, the Tigres del Chinandega, the Leones de León, and the Orientales de Granada. There is one defunct team, the Fieras del San Fernando.

See also
Baseball awards#Nicaragua
Baseball awards#Americas

External links
 Nicaragua Baseball official site
 Campeonato German Pomares

References

 
Nicaragua